The London cast of Dippy is a plaster cast replica of the fossilised bones of a Diplodocus carnegii skeleton, the original of which – also known as Dippy – is on display at Pittsburgh's Carnegie Museum of Natural History. It began a national tour of British museums in February 2018. Dippy returned to London in June 2022, and will be relocated to another UK museum as a long-term loan in 2023.

Background

The genus Diplodocus was first described in 1878 by Othniel Charles Marsh.  The fossilised skeleton from which Dippy was cast was discovered in Wyoming in 1898, and acquired by the Scottish-American industrialist Andrew Carnegie for his newly-founded Carnegie Museum of Natural History in Pittsburgh.  The bones were soon recognised as a new species, and named Diplodocus carnegii.

King Edward VII, then a keen trustee of the British Museum, saw a sketch of the bones at Carnegie's Scottish home, Skibo Castle, in 1902, and Carnegie agreed to donate a cast to the Natural History Museum as a gift.  Carnegie paid £2,000 for the casting in plaster of paris, copying the original fossil bones held by the Carnegie Museum (not mounted until 1907, as a new museum building was still being constructed to house it).

Natural History Museum

Early history

Reptile Gallery
The cast was mounted in the museum's Reptile Gallery to the left of the main hall (now the gallery of Human Biology) as it was too large to display in the Fossil Reptile Gallery (to the right of the main hall; now the gallery of Creepy Crawlies).

Carnegie paid to have additional casts made for display in many European capitals – including Berlin, Paris, Vienna, Bologna, St Petersburg and Madrid; one sent to Munich was never erected – as well as Mexico City and La Plata in Argentina, making Dippy the most-viewed dinosaur skeleton in the world. The cast in London quickly became an iconic representation of the museum, and has featured in many cartoons and other media, including the 1975 Disney comedy One of Our Dinosaurs Is Missing.

Dippy was taken to pieces and stored in the museum's basement during the Second World War to protect it from bomb damage, and reinstalled in the Reptile Gallery after the war.  The original presentation of the cast was altered several times to reflect changes in scientific opinion on the animal's stance.  The head and neck were originally posed in a downwards position, and were later moved to a more horizontal position in the 1960s.

Move to Hintze Hall
Dippy was removed from the Reptile Gallery in 1979 and repositioned as the centrepiece of the main central hall of the museum, later renamed the Hintze Hall in recognition of a large donation by Michael Hintze.  Dippy replaced a mounted African elephant, nicknamed George, which had been on display as the central exhibit in the main hall since 1907, with various other animal specimens.  The elephant had itself replaced the skeleton of a sperm whale which was the first significant exhibit in the hall and had been on display since at least 1895: earlier, the hall had been left largely empty.

Dippy was originally displayed alongside a cast of a Triceratops skeleton, which was removed around 1993.  The tail of the Diplodocus cast was also lifted to waft over the heads of visitors; originally it drooped to trail along the floor.

The whale had been stranded on sandbanks at the mouth of Wexford Harbour, Ireland in March 1891. Its skeleton was acquired by the museum and had been displayed in the Large Mammals Hall (originally the New Whale Hall) since 1934.

Dippy returned to the Natural History Museum as part of a temporary exhibition in June 2022, after which the museum intends to relocate the replica to a new location as part of a 3-year loan. The Museum opened applications for the new venue in March 2022.

Removal and tour

The work involved in removing Dippy and replacing it with the whale skeleton was documented in a BBC Television special, Horizon: Dippy and the Whale, narrated by David Attenborough, which was first broadcast on BBC Two on 13 July 2017, the day before the whale skeleton was unveiled for public display.

Dippy started a tour of British museums in February 2018, mounted on a new and more mobile armature. Dippy has been on display at the following locations around the United Kingdom:
Dorset County Museum, Dorchester (10 February – 7 May 2018)
Birmingham Museum and Art Gallery (26 May – 9 September 2018)
Ulster Museum, Belfast (17 September 2018 – 6 January 2019)
Kelvingrove Art Gallery and Museum, Glasgow (22 January – 6 May 2019)
Great North Museum, Newcastle upon Tyne (18 May – 6 October 2019)
National Museum Cardiff (19 October 2019 – 26 January 2020)
Number One Riverside, Rochdale (10 February 2020 –)
Norwich Cathedral (13 July – 30 October 2021)

See also
 Archie (squid)
 Sophie the Stegosaurus

Notes

References
 Diplodocus: this is your life, Natural History Museum
 Dippy on Tour, Natural History Museum
 Taking Dippy down: the first steps, Natural History Museum
 Natural History Museum unveils 'Dippy' the Diplodocus replacement Hope the blue whale, The Independent, 14 July 2017
 Bone Wars: The Excavation and Celebrity of Andrew Carnegie's Dinosaur, Tom Rea, pp. 1–11

External links
 

Dinosaur sculptures
Natural History Museum, London